Sikkilsdalshøa is a mountain in Nord-Fron Municipality in Innlandet county, Norway. The mountain is surrounded by several other notable mountains including Heimdalshøe and Styggehøe to the southwest and Gravdalsknappen and Ingulssjøhøi to the northeast.

See also
List of mountains of Norway by height

References

Nord-Fron
Mountains of Innlandet